Port-sur-Saône is a commune in the Haute-Saône department in the region of Bourgogne-Franche-Comté in eastern France.

It was probably the Roman Portus Abucini.

Population

Twin towns
Port-sur-Saône is twinned with:
  Brest, Belarus
  Cahul, Moldova
  Man, Ivory Coast
  Kursenai, Lithuania
There are also friendship within the town:
  Grodzisk Mazowiecki, Poland
  Lezhë, Albania

See also
Communes of the Haute-Saône department

References

Communes of Haute-Saône
Sequani